Nizam Uddin Jalil John is a Bangladeshi politician and member of the 11th Jatiya Sangsad representing Naogaon-5 constituency. He was elected in the 2018 election representing Awami League.

Personal life 
Jalil was born in Naogaon Sadar Upazila, Naogaon District. His father's name is Abdul Jalil, who served as the general secretary of Awami League and his mother's name is Rehana Jalil. He joined the law profession in 2018.

Political life
Nizam was elected in the 2018 Jatiya Sangsad election for Awami League, representing Naogaon-5 constituency, he is the youngest member of the 11th National Parliament.

References

11th Jatiya Sangsad members
Awami League politicians
People from Naogaon District
Year of birth missing (living people)
Living people